Darko Pavlović (born 18 April 1995) is a Serbian football midfielder who plays for FK Takovo.

References

External links
 
 Darko Pavlović Stats at utakmica.rs

1995 births
Living people
Sportspeople from Peja
Association football midfielders
Serbian footballers
FK Metalac Gornji Milanovac players
FK Jedinstvo Užice players
FK Polet Ljubić players
FK Takovo players
Serbian First League players
Serbian SuperLiga players